Naum Sekulovski (born 14 May 1982 in Melbourne, Victoria, Australia) is an Australian football (soccer) player who plays for Preston Lions in the NPL 2 Victoria competition.

A League career statistics 
(Correct as of 21 March 2010)

Honours

Perth Glory FC
Best Clubman: 2010

External links
 Perth Glory profile
 Oz Football profile

1982 births
Living people
Soccer players from Melbourne
Sekulovski|Naum
Parramatta Power players
Perth Glory FC players
A-League Men players
Preston Lions FC players
Expatriate footballers in Indonesia
Victorian Institute of Sport alumni
Goulburn Valley Suns FC players
National Premier Leagues players
Association football defenders
Gippsland Falcons players
Australian soccer players
Australian expatriate soccer players
Australian expatriate sportspeople in Indonesia